AS Tata National is a Malian football club based in Sikasso. As of 2008, they last played in the top division in Malian football during the 2006/07 season. Their home stadium is Stade Omnisports.

References

Football clubs in Mali
Sikasso